The men's 400 metre individual medley event at the 2014 Commonwealth Games as part of the swimming programme took place on 25 July at the Tollcross International Swimming Centre in Glasgow, Scotland.

The medals were presented by Bruce Robertson, Vice-President of the Commonwealth Games Federation and the quaichs were presented by Nicola Sturgeon, Deputy First Minister of Scotland.

Records
Prior to this competition, the existing world and Commonwealth Games records were as follows.

The following records were established during the competition:

Results

Heats

Final

References

External links

Men's 400 metre individual medley
Commonwealth Games